Stepaside Spur is a prominent spur in the Ross Dependency of Antarctica. 1,750 m high, it is at the east side of Upper Staircase and the Skelton Glacier. It was surveyed and named in 1957 by the New Zealand party of the Commonwealth Trans-Antarctic Expedition, 1956–58.

Ridges of the Ross Dependency
Hillary Coast